Wittenbra is a location on the now closed Gwabegar railway line in north-western New South Wales, Australia. A station was located there between 1923 and 1960.

References

Disused regional railway stations in New South Wales
Railway stations in Australia opened in 1923
Railway stations closed in 1960